Christopher James (born 1975) is a British poet.

Life
Christopher James was educated at Newcastle and the University of East Anglia, where he graduated with an MA in Creative Writing. He now lives in Suffolk with his wife, young family.
He works in London as head of corporate communications for the Scout Association. 
Prior to this he worked in advertising for both J&L Group and CPG Yorkshire selling advertising features to business-to-business magazines.

His work has appeared in The Rialto (poetry magazine), Smiths Knoll, The London Magazine, Iota, The Frogmore Papers and Magma.

Awards
James has previously won the Bridport, and Ledbury poetry prizes, and the 2008 National Poetry Competition.

Work
John Lennon on the Great Wall of China
 The Invention of Butterfly, 2006, Ragged Raven Poetry,

References

1975 births
Living people
Alumni of the University of East Anglia
21st-century British poets
21st-century British male writers
British male poets